The Calhoun Mine is perhaps the oldest and best-known mine in Lumpkin County, Georgia. When gold was discovered in Lumpkin County in 1828, which led to the Georgia Gold Rush in 1829, it was discovered on  owned by Robert Obar. After at least two intermediary sales, the land was purchased by Senator John C. Calhoun of South Carolina, who was also the 7th Vice President of the United States. Calhoun started a mining company to mine the land and later allowed his son-in-law Thomas Green Clemson, the founder of Clemson University, to manage it. The ore deposit was a very rich deposit and, according to an 1856 letter from Clemson to his brother-in-law, was still producing significant quantities of gold nearly 30 years after its initial discovery on the land. This mine - along with the Consolidated Mine and the Loud Mine - were some of the most productive mines in the Georgia Gold Belt.

In 1879, the Calhoun Mine passed from the Calhoun family. In 1939, after the deposits at the Calhoun Mine were long thought to be depleted, a small pocket was discovered and mined. After that excitement, things became quiet once again at the mine. The Calhoun Mine was added to the National Register of Historic Places and named a National Historic Landmark in 1973.

Calhoun Mine is located about 3 miles (5 km) south of Dahlonega off State Route 60 and on the eastern side of the Chestatee River. It lies on a hill on the west side of the road - about 0.6 miles (1 km) off the road - on the opposite side of the ridge, on private property.

The mine was designated a National Historic Landmark and listed on the National Register of Historic Places in 1973, for its nationally significant role as an instigating element of the Cherokee removal.  The mine was located directly adjacent to Cherokee land, and the conflict with miners illegally working Cherokee lands contributed to calls for removal, and the eventual displacement of, the Cherokee from their lands.

See also
List of National Historic Landmarks in Georgia (U.S. state)
National Register of Historic Places listings in Lumpkin County, Georgia

References

External links
Gold in Georgia by Sylvia Gailey Head
"Thar's Gold in Them Thar Hills': Gold and Gold Mining in Georgia, 1830s-1940s from the Digital Library of Georgia
Georgia Division of Archives and History Photo - Interior of stamp mill at Calhoun Mine, 1899
Georgia Division of Archives and History Photo - entrance to Calhoun Mine, 1955

Georgia Gold Rush
Gold mines in Georgia
Mines in Lumpkin County, Georgia
National Historic Landmarks in Georgia (U.S. state)
Geology of Georgia (U.S. state)
Underground mines in the United States
National Register of Historic Places in Lumpkin County, Georgia